Theodore Dieckmann (November 6, 1853 – October 6, 1919) was an American politician and businessman.

Born in New York City, Dieckmann moved with his parents to Sheboygan, Wisconsin in 1858. Dieckmann owned a jewelry business in Sheboygan, Wisconsin. He served on the Sheboygan Common Council and was mayor of the city. In 1893, Dieckmann served in the Wisconsin State Assembly and was a Republican. Dieckmann died at his home in Sheboygan, Wisconsin.

Notes

1853 births
1919 deaths
Politicians from New York City
Businesspeople from Wisconsin
Mayors of Sheboygan, Wisconsin
Wisconsin city council members
Republican Party members of the Wisconsin State Assembly
19th-century American politicians
19th-century American businesspeople